Boulware Township is an inactive township in Gasconade County, in the U.S. state of Missouri.

Boulware Township was named after Philip Boulware, a county official.

References

Townships in Missouri
Townships in Gasconade County, Missouri